Life and Colour is a 2005 Spanish film directed by  in his feature length directorial debut.

Plot 
Spain, 1975. Fede, a fifteen-year-old boy, is getting conscious of his environment little by little: his sister Begoña, unsatisfied with her imminent wedding; his grandfather, who stops dealing with his best friend after the Spanish Civil War; his friend Ramona, a girl with Down syndrome who was raped by her father, a young man who works with his father.

Cast

Release 
The film was presented at the 50th Valladolid International Film Festival (Seminci) in October 2005. It was theatrically released in Spain on 5 January 2006.

Accolades 

|-
| align = "center" | 2005 || 50th Valladolid International Film Festival || colspan  = "2" | Public's Choice Award ||  || 
|-
| align = "center" | 2006 || 20th Goya Awards || Best New Director || Santiago Tabernero ||  || 
|}

See also 
 List of Spanish films of 2006

References

External links

2005 films
Films set in 1975
2000s Spanish-language films
2005 drama films
Films set in Spain
Down syndrome in film
Spanish drama films
2000s Spanish films
2005 directorial debut films